Judy or Judith Shepherd may refer to:

Judy Shepherd of the Shepherd Sisters
Judy Shepherd, character in Jumanji

See also
Judy Shepard (disambiguation)